Carlos Baena may refer to:

 Carlos Baena (animator)
 Carlos Alberto Baena (born 1967), Colombian politician
 Carlos Martínez Baena (1889–1971), Spanish-Mexican actor

See also
Baena (disambiguation)